The Gwent County League (known as the Autocentres Gwent County FA League for sponsorship reasons) is a football league in South Wales, consisting of 3 divisions, named the Premier Division, Division One and Division Two. The Premier Division is a feeder to the Ardal Leagues, and therefore sits at tier 4 of the Welsh football pyramid.

The league was formed in 1980 from a merger of the Monmouthshire Senior League and the Gwent Premier League.

Member clubs for 2022–23 season

Premier Division

Aberbargoed Buds
Abercarn United
Abertillery Excelsiors
AFC Pontymister
Caerleon
Coed Eva Athletic
Cwmbrân Town
Lucas Cwmbran
New Inn
Newport Civil Service
Newport Corinthians 
Panteg
Pill
Rogerstone
Wattsville
Ynysddu Welfare

Division One

Albion Rovers
Cefn Fforest
Clydach Wasps
Cromwell
Cwmffwdoer Sports
FC Tredegar
Graig Villa Dino
Llanhilleth Athletic
Machen
Nantyglo
Newport Saints
Pentwynmawr Athletic
P.I.L.C.S.
Rhymney

Division Two

Crickhowell
Cwmcarn Athletic
Mardy
Neuadd Wen
Oak
Pontnewydd
Ponthir
Riverside Rovers 
Thornwell Red & White
Trinant
Usk Town

Champions

References

External links
 Official website

 
Sports leagues established in 1980
1980 establishments in Wales
Wales
Wales
Football leagues in Wales